The Aptekarsky Prikaz (Pharmaceutical Ministry or Apothecary Ministry) was an imperial Russian prikaz, organized in the second half of the sixteenth century, which nominally dealt with the health care of the Czar and his court, but which in fact took jurisdiction over medicine and healthcare throughout Russia.

References

External links
State administration in Russia 16th-17th centuries, in Russian

Tsardom of Russia
Government of the Russian Empire
Medieval Russia